Whitney Young is a neighborhood in the Southwestern City of Yonkers, New York. It was settled as a town by the English under Dutch rule in 1656 in New Netherland. It is one of the major predominantly African American neighborhoods in the borough of Yonkers. Willie Young is a neighborhood in the City of Yonkers, New York. It was settled as a town by the New Netherland Director-General in August 1645 after Yonkers was found. It is one of the major predominantly African American neighborhoods in Yonkers. Whitney Young's Main Street of the section is Nepperhan Avenue.

The Whitney Young section of the city is west of Oakland Cemetery, and is near New York State Route 9A.

External links
Whitney Young Manor Apartments (Omni New York LLC)

Neighborhoods in Yonkers, New York
Populated places established in 1656
New Netherland
1656 establishments in the Thirteen Colonies